The Jõelähtme River (also known as Raasiku jõgi or Jõelehtme jõgi) is an Estonian river in the county of Harjumaa. The river starts in Rasivere (Anija Parish) and discharges in the Jägala River in Jõelähtme Parish, only a  after the Jägala Waterfall. The length of the river is 49.2 km.

Jõelähtme River is one of the most important secret rivers in Estonia, which uses the Kostivere karst area to flow underground for 2.5 km.

References

Rivers of Estonia
Landforms of Harju County